Edinho Pattinama (born 1 March 1989) is a Dutch footballer, currently playing for sixth-tier club SV Deltasport Vlaardingen. He is the son of former footballer Ton Pattinama, who is the manager of Deltasport. His twin brother Jordao also plays for Deltasport.

Statistics 

(As of December 20, 2008)

References

External links
Edinho Pattinama at Voetbal International

1989 births
Living people
Dutch footballers
Association football forwards
Dutch people of Indonesian descent
Dutch people of Moluccan descent
NAC Breda players
Eredivisie players
Dutch twins
People from Spijkenisse
Twin sportspeople
Footballers from South Holland